LJN was a toy and video game company located in New York City.

LJN may also refer to:

 Texas Gulf Coast Regional Airport, assigned LJN by the IATA
 Lucknow Junction railway station, station code LJN